Arthaberites is a genus of ceratitid cephalopods included in the Noritidae that lived during the Middle Triassic, found in the Alps and Balkans of Europe. Its type is A. alexandrae.

Arthaberites has an involute, compressed, discoidal shell  with a narrow flatted venter, or outer rim.

References 

 Arkell et al., 1957. Mesozoic Ammonoidea. Treatise on Invertebrate Paleontology, Part L. Geological Soc. of America and University of Kansas Press.

Noritidae
Ceratitida genera
Middle Triassic ammonites
Ammonites of Europe